İzzettin Çalışlar (1882 in Yanya (Ioannina), Janina Vilayet – August 20, 1951 in Istanbul) was an officer of the Ottoman Army and a general of the Turkish Army. He also served as a politician and was a prominent member of the Kemalist movement.

Works
İstiklâl Harbi Hatıraları
II nci İnönü Muharebesinde 61 nci Fırka, 1932.
61 nci Fırkanın Gediz ve Kütahya Muharebeleri, 1932.
Sakarya Meydan Muharebesinde 1 nci Grup, 1932.
Sakarya'dan İzmir'e kadar I inci Kolordu, 1932.
 İzzettin Çalışlar (ed. İsmet Görgülü), Atatürk'le İkibuçuk Yıl – Orgeneral Çalışlar'ın anıları, Yapı Kredi Yayınları, 1993.
 İzzettin Çalışlar (ed.: İsmet Görgülü), On Yıllık Savaşın Günlüğü: Balkan, Birinci Dünya ve İstiklal Savaşları, Yapı Kredi Yayınları, 1997, .
 İzzettin Çalışlar, Gün Gün, Saat Saat İstiklâl Harbi'nde Batı Cephesi: Org. İzzetin Çalışlar'ın Anılarıyla, Türkiye İş Bankası Kültür Yayınları, 2009, .

See also
List of high-ranking commanders of the Turkish War of Independence

Sources

External links 

Yetkin İşcen & Haluk Oral, Dead Man's Flask in www.gallipoli-1915.org

1882 births
1951 deaths
Military personnel from Ioannina
People from Janina vilayet
Ottoman Imperial School of Military Engineering alumni
Ottoman Military College alumni
Ottoman Army officers
Ottoman military personnel of the Balkan Wars
Ottoman military personnel of World War I
Turkish military personnel of the Greco-Turkish War (1919–1922)
Recipients of the Medal of Independence with Red Ribbon (Turkey)
Turkish Army generals
Deputies of Aydın
Burials at Turkish State Cemetery
Deputies of Muğla
Deputies of Balıkesir
Commanders of the Second Army of Turkey
Republican People's Party (Turkey) politicians